Ian Ferguson may refer to:

 Ian Ferguson (canoeist) (born 1952), Olympic kayaker from New Zealand
 Ian Ferguson (writer), Canadian writer
 Ian Ferguson (footballer, born 1967), former Rangers F.C. and Scotland footballer, now a manager in Australia with the Central Coast Mariners, North Queensland Fury and Perth Glory
 Ian Ferguson (footballer, born 1968), Scottish former professional footballer with, amongst other teams, Hearts and St. Johnstone
 Ian Bruce Ferguson (1917–1988), Australian Army officer in World War II and the Korean War

See also
Iain Ferguson (born 1962), Scottish footballer with Dundee, Rangers, Dundee United, Hearts and Motherwell
Iain Ferguson (businessman), British businessman
Ian Fergusson (born 1965), BBC weather presenter